iCon College is a privately run academic institution in Greece.

See also
 Education in Greece
 List of universities in Greece

External links
iCon College web site

Private universities and colleges in Greece
For-profit universities and colleges in Europe
Business schools in Greece
Education in Athens